The Spirit of Christmas: Christmas Carols Sung by The Mormon Tabernacle Choir is an album by the Mormon Tabernacle Choir. It was released in 1959 on the Columbia Masterworks label (catalog nos. MS-6100).

The album debuted on Billboard magazine's popular albums chart on December 28, 1959, peaked at No. 5, and remained on that chart for two weeks.

Track listing
Side 1
 "Lo, How A Rose E'er Blooming" (arranged by Michael Praetorius) [2:32]
 "Tell Us, Shepherd Maids" (arranged by Mary E. Caldwell) [2:16]
 "O Little Town Of Bethlehem" (music by Lewis H. Redner, written Phillips Brooks) [1:44]
 "The Snow Lay On The Ground" (arranged by Leo Sowerby) [3:38]
 "The Shepherds' Story" (lyrics by William Morris, written by Clarence Dickinson) [4:32]
 "For Christ Is Born" (arranged by R. Crawford, written by K. Aiken, Mary E. Crawford) [4:12]
 "Hark! The Herald Angels Sing!" (adapted by W. H. Cummings, music by Felix Mendelssohn, words by Charles Wesley) [1:42]
 "While Shepherds Watched Their Flocks" (arranged by Arthur Warrell) [2:12]
 "The Coventry Carol" (arranged by Bryceson Treharne) [3:32]

Side 2
 "Silent Night, Holy Night" (music by Franz Gruber, words by Josef Mohr) [3:15]
 "Carol Of The Bells" (arranged by Peter J. Wilhousky, written by M. Leontovich) [1:30]
 "Glory To God In The Highest" (written by Giovanni B. Pergolesi) [3:28]
 "The Three Kings" (lyrics by Rev. Lluis Romeu, translated by Deems Taylor, written by Kurt Schindler) [2:30]
 "Break Forth, O Beauteous Heavenly Light (Christmas Oratorio)" (written by Johan S. Bach) [1:50]
 "Bethlehem Night" (lyrics by W. Leslie Nicholls, music by Arthur Warrell) [1:55]
 "What Perfume Is This? O Shepherds, Say!" (arranged by Samuel Liddle) [2:12]
 "Christmas Day" (written by Gustav Holst) [7:06]
 "O Come, All Ye Faithful" (written by F. Oakley) [1:40]

References

1959 albums
Columbia Records albums
Tabernacle Choir albums